The Girl with the Jazz Heart is a 1921 American silent comedy film directed by Lawrence C. Windom and written by Philip Lonergan and George Mooser. The film stars Madge Kennedy, Joe King, Pierre Gendron, William Walcott, Helen Dubois, and Robert Vaughn. It was released on January 7, 1921, by Goldwyn Pictures.

Cast       
Madge Kennedy as Kittie Swasher / Miriam Smith
Joe King as Miles Sprague
Pierre Gendron as Tommie Fredericks 
William Walcott as Miriam's Uncle
Helen Dubois as Miriam's Aunt
Robert Vaughn as Simeon Althoff
Emil Hoch as Detective Quinn
Lillian Worth as Camille
Robert Emmett Tansey as Jimmie 
Dorothy Haight as Mamie

References

External links

Still at gettyimages.com
Still and synopsis at silenthollywood.com

1921 films
1920s English-language films
Silent American comedy films
1921 comedy films
Goldwyn Pictures films
American silent feature films
American black-and-white films
Films directed by Lawrence C. Windom
1920s American films